Boullay-lès-Troux is a commune located thirty kilometers south-west of Paris in the department of Essonne in the Île-de-France region.

Inhabitants of Boullay-les-Troux are known as Boullaisiens.

See also
Communes of the Essonne department

References

External links

Mayors of Essonne Association 

Communes of Essonne